Sun Xin may refer to:

Sun Xin (Three Kingdoms), member of the Sun clan who ruled Eastern Wu (229–280)
Sun Xin (Water Margin), a Chinese literary character 
Sun Xin (physicist), a member of the Chinese Academy of Sciences
Sun Xin, member of the GNZ48 Chinese idol girl group